Tverlandet Church is a parish church of the Church of Norway in Bodø Municipality in Nordland county, Norway. It is located in the village of Løding. It is one of the two churches for the Saltstraumen parish which is part of the Bodø domprosti (deanery) in the Diocese of Sør-Hålogaland. The modern, brick church was built in a fan-shaped style in 1983 using plans drawn up by the architect Reidar Berg. The church seats about 320 people. The church was consecrated on 6 November 1983.

See also
List of churches in Sør-Hålogaland

References

Churches in Bodø
Churches in Nordland
Brick churches in Norway
20th-century Church of Norway church buildings
Churches completed in 1983
1983 establishments in Norway
Fan-shaped churches in Norway